Camborne railway station serves the town of Camborne, Cornwall, England. It is located on Trevu Road in the town, adjacent to a level crossing and the Railway Hotel.

It has been in use since 1843 and is currently managed by Great Western Railway. Services are provided by GWR and CrossCountry.

History
The Hayle Railway opened on 23 December 1837. It was designed to move goods to and from local mines and the harbours at Hayle and Portreath but a passenger service started on 26 May 1843. The West Cornwall Railway took over the Hayle company on 3 November 1846. It extended the line westwards to Penzance railway station and opened a new, more convenient, Redruth railway station on 11 March 1852. Later that year the line was continued eastwards to a temporary station at Truro Highertown, and was completed to a station at Newham Wharf in 1855.

The station buildings have been replaced by some in the style used by the Great Western Railway circa 1900. The railway was originally just a single track with a passing loop in the station. In 1895 a second line was laid to the east, and in 1900 to the west. Goods sidings were originally laid on both sides of the station, with a goods shed behind the westbound platform. The sidings on the north side of the station were removed in 1937 which allowed the eastbound platform to be lengthened. The sidings on the south side, along with the goods shed, were taken out of use in 1965 and this platform was also extended in 1980.

Stationmasters

Mr. Rowe ca. 1853
Richard Rowe Youlden ca. 1871 -  1880
Mr. Evans 1880
George Edward Davies ca 1881 - 1889
Lawrence C.W. Reed 1889 - 1905 (formerly station master at Helston, afterwards station master at Llanelly)
Frederick Henry Cowling 1905 - 1909
James William Marks 1909 - 1919 (formerly station master at Pewsey)
E.S. Prior 1919 - 1926 (formerly station master at Tavistock, afterwards station master at Falmouth)
W.H. Cowling 1926 - 1937
T.C. Evans 1938 - 1948
Arthur John Strong from 1948
Leslie Wilfred Gordon Mott  1953 - 1957
Claude Peters 1957 - 1965

Description
Platform 1 is for westbound trains to Hayle, St Erth and Penzance. There is parking alongside this platform and at the end the car park is an old railway goods shed, although it is no longer used for its original purpose. Platform 2 is served by eastbound trains to Truro, Plymouth and London. The main station buildings are situated on platform 2, which is the one nearest the town centre. There is a small car park behind the station buildings, which contain a booking office, café and waiting room with toilets. A level crossing passes over the line at the east end of the two platforms.

Services

This includes the Night Riviera overnight sleeping car service and the mid-morning Cornish Riviera.

CrossCountry also provide one service in each direction from Plymouth-Penzance.

Signalling
Signals in the area are controlled by a signal box at Roskear Junction to the east of the town, where the signalman can oversee an adjacent level crossing. This was opened circa 1895 and contained 29 levers. The lever frame has been removed and the box now contains individual switches on the block shelf. Its signals are identified by the code letter 'R'.

A signal box at Camborne station had been built on the eastbound platform next to the level crossing in 1895 and but closed on 8 June 1970, since when the signalman at Roskear Junction has monitored the level crossing at Camborne by CCTV. The reason for retaining this signal box was that it also controlled the goods branch line to North Roskear, but this closed in July 1983.

References

External links

Railway stations in Cornwall
Former Great Western Railway stations
Railway stations in Great Britain opened in 1843
Railway stations served by Great Western Railway
Railway stations served by CrossCountry
1843 establishments in England
Camborne
DfT Category E stations